The 2011 FIA GT1 Abu Dhabi round was an auto racing event held at the Yas Marina Circuit in Abu Dhabi, United Arab Emirates.  Taking place over 25–26 March 2011, Abu Dhabi was the opening round of the 2011 FIA GT1 World Championship season.  It is the second consecutive year that FIA GT1 has opened its season in Abu Dhabi, although the 2011 event will be held on a shorter  layout of the Yas Marina Circuit.  Marc Hennerici is the only returning driver who won during the event last season, while Corvette and Ford both are defending victors.  The event is also unique on the FIA GT1 calendar as it is the only one held over a two-day period rather than the normal three; Qualifying is held following Practice on Friday while the Qualifying Race and Championship race are both held on Saturday.  The weekend is shared with a trio of local racing series: The UAE Sportscar series, the Cytech UAE GT series, and the Total UAE Touring Cars series.

Münnich Motorsport earned pole position in the qualifying session, only to be penalized for an infraction and handing pole to the Young Driver team of Stefan Mücke and Darren Turner.  Early incidents in the Qualifying Race led to Marc VDS Ford winning their first GT1 race with Maxime Martin and Frédéric Makowiecki driving.  Marc VDS was unable to hold the lead after starting from pole in the Championship Race as a quick pit stop vaulted Stef Dusseldorp and Clivio Piccione's Hexis Aston Martin into the race lead, fending off the Nissan of JR Motorsports but less than half a second at the finish.

Background
Following the announcement of an entry list featuring twenty cars from ten teams for the full 2011 season, only eighteen were entered for Abu Dhabi.  The two Corvette squads of Team China and DKR Engineering both entered only a single car due to each team lacking a second chassis.  All eighteen cars participated in a pre-season test held at the circuit on 23 March, with the No. 37 Münnich Motorsport Lamborghini of Nicky Pastorelli and Dominik Schwager setting the fastest lap of the day, followed by their second team car.

Qualifying

Qualifying result
For qualifying, Driver 1 participates in the first and third sessions while Driver 2 participates in only the second session.  The fastest lap for each session is indicated with bold.

 The No. 37 Münnich Lamborghini was given a penalty of five grid spots for the Qualifying Race for ignoring a marshal's flag requiring the car to pits after illegally starting from an external battery during Qualifying 1.
 The No. 40 Marc VDS Ford was given a penalty of five grid spots for the Qualifying Race for changing an engine during practice.

Races

Qualifying Race

Race result

Championship Race

Race result

Standings after the race 

Drivers' Championship standings

Teams' Championship standings

 Note: Only the top five positions are included for both sets of standings.

References

External links
 Yas Marina GT1 Race in Abu Dhabi – FIA GT1 World Championship

Abu Dhabi
FIA GT1
Motorsport competitions in the United Arab Emirates